Club Deportivo Málaga was a Spanish football club based in Málaga, in the autonomous community of Andalusia. It played twenty seasons in La Liga, before being dissolved in 1992.

History

Origins

The first football club in Málaga was established in 1904, with the formation of the Málaga Foot-Ball Club. It was nothing more than a society intended to promote football, a new sport in the city, carried from the United Kingdom. Its first rivals were small teams formed by crews of foreign ships arriving in the local harbor. In 1907, further attempts of popularizing football were performed by Málaga FC.

1912 saw the arrival of a rival club, FC Malagueño, and the establishment of a great rivalry with Málaga FC, which had merged with other minor clubs like Málaga Racing. In 1927, Málaga FC became the Real Málaga FC after they were granted royal patronage by Alfonso XIII.

During the 1929–30 season both Real Málaga FC and FC Malagueño clubs became founding members of the Tercera División. In late 1930, Real Málaga FC, were reformed as the Málaga Sport Club.

Club merging in 1933
In 1933 Málaga SC and FC Malagueño merged to become Club Deportivo Malacitano, although it wasn't a real merging at all, but a name change of FC Malagueño, which had economic wealth and a better squad than Málaga SC. By this operation, the CD Malacitano was able to heir the squad of FC Malagueño, having their contracts cancelled in the other way.

In 1934 this new club made its debut in the Segunda División when the division was expanded from ten teams to twenty four. After various seasons in the Segunda División, with the competition interrupted because of the Spanish Civil War.

In 1941 the club changed their name to the Club Deportivo Málaga when the new La Rosaleda stadium was inaugurated.

First promotion to La Liga in 1949, first topflight years
In 1949, Málaga was promoted for the first time to La Liga after several seasons in the Segunda División and a couple in the third level.

With chairman Miguel Navarro Nogueroles and coach Luís Urquiri, the club managed to get promoted in the last play of the 1948–49 season, in second position after Real Sociedad, and thanks to positive goal difference with Granada CF. Notable striker Pedro Bazán, who had previously scored nine goals in a sole match against the Hércules CF on January 4, 1949 in the Segunda División. He was the top goal scorer with 266 total goals and also one of the most important players of the team.

In this first run in La Liga, Málaga stayed for two consecutive seasons, with notable former player Ricardo Zamora as coach of the team, and until the first relegation of the club at the end of 1950–51 season, lacking just one point to maintain status.

In the subsequent seasons, Málaga achieved two new promotions to La Liga in 1951–52 and 1953–54, being relegated after just one year in both. The 1952–53 season was notable because of a resounding 6–0 thrashing of the Real Madrid at La Rosaleda, the major result up to date for Málaga against that club.

The golden years in the early 1970s

After several new fleeting first level promotions in the 1960s, which turned out in immediate relegations,  Málaga were promoted once again in 1969–70 under the command of chairman Antonio Rodríguez López and coach Jenő Kálmár, to start a five-year top flight stay. However, president in charge Antonio Rodríguez López was brutally murdered by the Mafia in the year 1971, and was replaced by Rafael Serrano Carvajal for the next season.

With notable players like Miguel Ramos Vargas "Migueli", Sebastian Viberti, Juan Antonio Deusto and José Díaz Macías, the club achieved two seven league places in 1971–72 and 1973–74 (best results of the club up to date), a Ricardo Zamora Trophy in 1971–72 season performed by goalkeeper Deusto, and a 1972–73 run of the club in the Spanish Cup, where they were dumped out in the semifinals by Athletic Bilbao. They also notably scored a victory at Camp Nou for the first time after winning against FC Barcelona at the end of the 1971–72 season. The club also established in 1973 an official anthem, Málaga La Bombonera, and from that moment the song is still the official anthem of the club.

After a polemic exit by Viberti at the end of 1973–74 season, the so-called golden years ended with a new relegation to the second level in 1974–75.

Dissolution
In 1992, CD Málaga dissolved after financial difficulties.

Season to season
As Fútbol Club Malagueño

As Club Deportivo Malacitano

As Club Deportivo Málaga

20 seasons in La Liga
31 seasons in Segunda División
9 seasons in Tercera División

Honours

Domestic
Segunda División: 1951–52, 1966–67, 1987–88
Tercera División: 1943–44, 1945–46, 1959–60

Friendly
Trofeo Costa del Sol
 Winners (3): 1963, 1971, 1974

Trofeo Costa del Sol
Between 1961 and 1983, Málaga organised its own summer tournament, the Trofeo Costa del Sol. The hosts won it on three occasions, successively defeating Real Madrid, Red Star Belgrade and Derby County. In 2003, the competition was revived by Club Deportivo's successor, Málaga CF.

In 1976, CD Málaga won a similar summer trophy, the Trofeo Ciudad de La Línea, played in La Línea de la Concepción, near Gibraltar. The triumph arrived after penalty shootout defeats of FC Dinamo Tbilisi and Valencia CF, after 0–0 draws.

Selected former players

Famous coaches
  Helenio Herrera
 Otto Bumbel
 Jenő Kálmár
  Ladislao Kubala
 Domènec Balmanya
 Antonio Benítez
 Marcel Domingo
 Ricardo Zamora
 José María Zárraga
 Milorad Pavić

References

External links 
File of CD Málaga at La futbolteca

 
Defunct football clubs in Andalusia
Sport in Málaga
Association football clubs established in 1904
Association football clubs disestablished in 1992
1904 establishments in Spain
1992 disestablishments in Spain
Segunda División clubs
La Liga clubs